Deokjeokdo or Deokjeok Island is the largest island of Deokjeok-myeon in Ongjin County, Incheon Metropolitan City, South Korea.

Geography 
It can be reached from the ferry terminal in Incheon. It is an hour by hydrofoil from the mainland. A hiking trail leads to the top of one of two peaks on the island; the other peak is a military reservation. On the west side there is a beach with hotels, min-baks (rooms for rent in personal homes) yeong-wons (guesthouses, the lowest of the accommodation selections) and  restaurants. The island is reforested almost entirely in pine trees. There are up to seven boats per day in the summer, but only one in other seasons. The boat leaves at different times in the morning, depending on the tides. Tourists often visit from the mainland. There is a bus from the ferry dock to the other side of the island.

As the wetlands do not appear even in low tide, visitors can fish on rocks near Seopori Ferry. Bijobong, a 292m-high peak in the center of the island, divides the island into Seopo-ri to the south and Buk-ri to the north. Deokjeokdo Island's most popular tourism resources are the two sand beaches, Seopori and Batjireum, and one pebble beach, Jagalmadang. Jinri Ferry operates transits to Seopo-ri and Buk-ri. Local businesses also offer pickup services using private vehicles. Cycling for a day trip is possible and bicycles are allowed on the ferry for a fee (payment to the island only). The island's roads are paved and the grade over the mountains between Seopori and Batjireum Beach is a relatively steep 18% grade.

Deokjeokdo can also be reached by a 2-hour ferry from Daebudo Island. The most direct ferry leaves from Incheon's Yeon'an Pier daily (check the Jinri Ferry schedules which fluctuate seasonally).

References

Islands of Incheon
Islands of the Yellow Sea
Ongjin County, Incheon